Anhui Jiufang Football Club is a defunct Chinese football club from Hefei, Anhui. The club is owned by Anhui Jiarun Group with 15,000,000 RMB registered capital. At the end of the 2008 season, Anhui Jiufang qualified from China League Two (3rd tier of Chinese football) to China League One (2nd tier of Chinese football).

Anhui Jiufang was annexed by Tianjin Runyulong at the beginning of the 2011 league season.

Name history
2003–2004 Anhui Xuanfeng F.C. 安徽旋风
2005–2011 Anhui Jiufang F.C. 安徽九方

Results
All-time league Ranking

 in group stage

References

External links
 Official website

Defunct football clubs in China
Football clubs in China
Sport in Anhui
Association football clubs established in 2003
Association football clubs disestablished in 2011
2003 establishments in China
2011 disestablishments in China